The Abraham and Phoebe Ball House, located in Eugene, Oregon, is listed on the National Register of Historic Places.

See also
 National Register of Historic Places listings in Lane County, Oregon

References

1912 establishments in Oregon
Bungalow architecture in Oregon
Houses completed in 1912
Houses on the National Register of Historic Places in Eugene, Oregon
1910s architecture in the United States